Aliabad-e Sofla (also Romanized as ‘Alīābād-e Soflá; also known as ‘Alīābād) is a village in Doab Rural District, in the Central District of Selseleh County, Lorestan Province, Iran. At the 2006 census, its population was 125, in 23 families.

References 

Towns and villages in Selseleh County